Variations on a Theme of Chopin may refer to:

 Variations on a Theme of Chopin (Rachmaninoff)
 Variations on a Theme of Chopin (Mompou)
 Variations on a Theme of Chopin, by Roger Smalley
 Zehn Variationen über ein Präludium von Chopin, by Ferruccio Busoni